Ganga Prasad Prasain is an Indian academic administrator who is serving as the vice-chancellor of Tripura University. He is the former dean of Manipur University.

References

External links 
 Profile page on vidwan.inflibnet.ac.in

Year of birth missing (living people)
Living people
Heads of universities and colleges in India
Academic staff of Tripura University